Ryan Matthew Bollman  (born August 9, 1972) is an American television and film actor.

Roles
He played Micah in Children of the Corn II: The Final Sacrifice and has also starred in the films The Granny as Junior, True Blue, Lured Innocence, No Vacancy, The Neverending Story 3 as Dog, one of the Nasties, Only the Strong as Donovan, Kidsongs video (VHS) episode "What I Want to Be! (What I Want to Be) (1986)" as himself who replaced Ryan Kirk and was replaced by Jamie Weins in the next video (1987), Kids Incorporated episode "You've Got the Wrong Date (1987)" as Jason, Mama's Family episode "Child's Play" as Reverend Meechum's bratty grandson Eugene, Life Goes On as Lester, The Webbers as Jimmy Nelson, and Family Matters as Bobby.

References

External links

Ryan's official Fan page on Facebook
Ryan's official YouTube channel

1972 births
American male child actors
American male film actors
American male television actors
Living people
Male actors from St. Louis